Ally is a unisex given name, nickname and/or surname. It is a variant of Allie and Ali. It is used as a diminutive nickname for the given names Alison, Alexandra or Alyssa (feminine) or Alexander, Alister, or Alan (masculine).  Notable people with the name include:

Given name

Female
Ally Acker (born 1954), American filmmaker
Ally Anderson (born 1996), Australian rules footballer
Ally Baker (born 1986), American tennis player
Ally Blake, Australian writer
Ally Brooke (born 1993), American singer
Ally Carda (born 1993), American softball player
Ally Carter (born 1974), American author of young adult and adult fiction
Ally Condie (born 1971), American author
Ally Fowler (born 1961), Australian actress in 1980s soap operas
Ally Green (born 1998), Australian soccer player
Ally Haran (born 1996), Canadian-American soccer player
Ally Ioannides (born 1998), American actress
Ally Kennen (born 1975), British author
Ally Kuylaars (born 1971), South African cricketer
Ally Love, American sports host
Ally Lundström (born 1935), Swedish figure skater
Ally Maki (born 1986), American actress
Ally Malott (born 1992), American basketball player
Ally Marquand (born 1981), American soccer player
Ally McDonald (born 1992), American professional golfer
Ally Musika (born 1979), American writer
Ally Prisock (born 1997), American soccer player
Ally Ryan, American singer-songwriter
Ally Sheedy (born 1962), American actress
Ally Stacher (born 1987), American professional racing cyclist
Ally Venable (born 1999), American guitar player
Ally Walker (born 1961), American actress
Ally Watt (born 1997), American soccer player
Ally Wollaston (born 2001), New Zealand cyclist

Male
Ally Gallacher (1909–1964), Scottish football (soccer) manager 
Ally Law (born 1997), English YouTuber and urban explorer
Ally McCoist (born 1962), Scottish football (soccer) player
Ally MacLeod (1931–2004), Scottish football (soccer) player, and manager
Ally Maxwell (born 1965), Scottish football (soccer) coach and former professional footballer
Ally Shewan, Scottish football (soccer) player

Surname
Aziza Sleyum Ally, Member of Parliament in the National Assembly of Tanzania
Carl Ally (1924–1999), American advertising executive who founded Ally & Gargano  
Haji Ally (born 1968), Tanzanian boxer
Tony Ally (born 1973), British diver

Fictional characters
Ally Dawson from the television series Austin & Ally
Ally McBeal from the television series Ally McBeal

See also
Aly (disambiguation), includes list of people with name Aly
Allee, given name and surname
Allie, given name and surname

Unisex given names
Scottish feminine given names
Scottish masculine given names
Scottish unisex given names